Carlos Tufvesson is a fashion designer in Brazil. He attended Domus Academy, in Milan, Italy. In 2000, he opened a space in Ipanema: One side his atelier, the other a store front. In 2001, he released his first prêt-à-porter collection during the Semana Barra Shopping, a precursor event to Fashion Rio. In 2004, Tufvesson introduced his work internationally at the São Paulo Fashion Week.

Activism 

Tufvesson, who is openly gay, is well known for his activism in Brazil, especially for activities benefiting HIV/AIDS causes, but also for equal rights to access marriage, as it is administered and extended by the state. Architect André Piva is his life-partner, and both are well-recognized personalities, both by the LGBT community as well as the carioca society (i.e. the Who is who list in the city of Rio de Janeiro).

References

External links 
 Carlos Tufvesson (in Portuguese and in English).

Brazilian gay artists
Brazilian fashion designers
LGBT fashion designers
Living people
HIV/AIDS activists
Brazilian LGBT rights activists
Year of birth missing (living people)
21st-century Brazilian LGBT people
Brazilian people of Swedish descent